Battle Mountain High School is a secondary school in Eagle County, Colorado, United States. (BMHS)

The school was originally built in 1975 in the town of Eagle-Vail. Prior to that, it was a combined middle school/high school near Battle Mountain Pass, near the town of Minturn. In 2010 it was relocated to a new campus farther west in the town of Edwards. It continues to serve as one of Eagle County's primary high schools today. The new facility was designed by H+L Architecture of Denver.

References

External links

Eagle County Schools

 Public high schools in Colorado
 Schools in Eagle County, Colorado
Educational institutions established in 1963
1963 establishments in Colorado